Wabash is a city in Noble Township, Wabash County, in the U.S. state of Indiana. The population was 10,666 at the 2010 census. The city is the county seat of Wabash County.

Wabash is notable as claiming to be the first electrically lighted city in the world, which was inaugurated on March 31, 1880. However, closer inspection of the reference shows only the court house grounds were lighted. It is also home to the historic Eagles Theatre, Paradise Spring Treaty Grounds (1826), the Wabash and Erie Canal, Presbyterian Church (1880), and Disciples of Christ Christian Church (1865).

Geography
Wabash is located at  (40.800799, -85.827163). The Wabash River runs through the town, on its way towards Peru, where it splits creating a series of islands, and where the sandbars are quite common on this stretch.

Climate

History
The town of Wabash was platted in the spring of 1834 by Col. Hugh Hanna and Col. David Burr.

The name Wabash derives from a Miami-Illinois term for "water over white stones." The Wabash post office has been in operation since 1839. The Miami name reflected the clarity of the river in Huntington County, Indiana where the river bottom is limestone.

Wabash used a new type of carbon arc light invented by Charles Brush in 1870. On March 31, 1880, four 3,000-candle power lamps were suspended from the top of the courthouse. Two telegraph wires ran from the lamps to the courthouse basement, where they were connected to a generator powered by a 12-horsepower steam engine to provide power 

The James M. Amoss Building, Downtown Wabash Historic District, East Wabash Historic District, First Christian Church, Honeywell Memorial Community Center, Honeywell Studio, McNamee-Ford House, North Wabash Historic District, West Wabash Historic District, and Solomon Wilson Building are listed on the National Register of Historic Places.

Media
The Wabash Free Trader was published in Wabash from 1871 to 1876. The Wabash Weekly Courier was published from 1876 until 1887.

Demographics

2010 census
As of the census of 2010, there were 10,666 people, 4,465 households, and 2,805 families living in the city. The racial makeup of the city was 96.3% White, 0.4% African American, 1.0% Native American, 0.5% Asian, 0.6% from other races, and 1.2% from two or more races. Hispanic or Latino of any race were 2.0% of the population.

There were 4,465 households, of which 29.3% had children under the age of 18 living with them, 45.7% were married couples living together, 12.5% had a female householder with no husband present, 4.7% had a male householder with no wife present, and 37.2% were non-families. 32.6% of all households were made up of individuals, and 14.9% had someone living alone who was 65 years of age or older. The average household size was 2.31 and the average family size was 2.88.

The median age in the city was 41.3 years. 22.5% of residents were under the age of 18; 7.9% were between the ages of 18 and 24; 24.7% were from 25 to 44; 26.4% were from 45 to 64; and 18.8% were 65 years of age or older. The gender makeup of the city was 47.2% male and 52.8% female.

2000 census

As of the census of 2000, there were 11,743 people, 4,799 households, and 3,100 families living in the city. The racial makeup of the city was 96.85% White, 0.37% African American, 1.06% Native American, 0.51% Asian, 0.03% Pacific Islander, 0.41% from other races, and 0.77% from two or more races. Hispanic or Latino of any race were 1.46% of the population.

There were 4,799 households, out of which 29.2% had children under the age of 18 living with them, 49.6% were married couples living together, 11.1% had a female householder with no husband present, and 35.4% were non-families. 30.9% of all households were made up of individuals, and 13.4% had someone living alone who was 65 years of age or older. The average household size was 2.36 and the average family size was 2.95.

In the city, the population was spread out, with 24.3% under the age of 18, 9.0% from 18 to 24, 27.4% from 25 to 44, 22.9% from 45 to 64, and 16.4% who were 65 years of age or older. The median age was 37 years. For every 100 females, there were 91.0 males. For every 100 females age 18 and over, there were 87.3 males.

The median income for a household in the city was $12,000, and the median income for a family was $14000. Males had a median income of $18000 versus $12,000 for females. The per capita income for the city was $18,210. About 7.9% of families and 9.3% of the population were below the poverty line, including 12.5% of those under age 18 and 8.8% of those age 65 or over.

Education
The town has a lending library, the Wabash Carnegie Public Library.

Image gallery

Notable people 
 Michael Baber - music and sound editor 
 Adelaide Steele Baylor - federal education official 
Loren M. Berry – pioneer of Yellow Pages telephone directory
 Dr. Rick Brandenburg – entomologist
 John W. Corso – art director and production designer
 John P. Costas - telecommunications engineer, noted for Costas loop
 James E. Dabler - Illinois state representative and businessman
 Jimmy Daywalt – race car driver
 Charles Dingle - actor
 Gus Dorais – football player and coach of football, basketball, and baseball
 Crystal Gayle - country singer
 Mark Honeywell – founder of Honeywell Corporation and Honeywell Center
 Howard A. Howe - polio researcher
 O. P. Hubbard - member of the Alaska Senate (1915-1919).
 Bobby Jones – National Football League guard
 Joaquin Miller- poet and frontiersman
 George Mullin - Major League Baseball player, nicknamed "Wabash George"
 Keith O'Conner Murphy - Rockabilly Hall of Fame singer and songwriter
 Margie Stewart - U.S. Army poster girl during World War II

See also
The Ford Meter Box Company, prominent manufacturer headquartered in Wabash

References

External links
 City of Wabash, Indiana website

 
Cities in Indiana
Micropolitan areas of Indiana
Cities in Wabash County, Indiana
County seats in Indiana
1834 establishments in Indiana